German Hungarians are the German-speaking minority of Hungary, sometimes also called Danube Swabians (German: Donauschwaben, Hungarian: dunai svábok), many of whom call themselves "Shwoveh" in their own Swabian dialect. There are 131,951 German speakers in Hungary (according to the 2011 census). Danube Swabian is a collective term for a number of German ethnic groups who lived in the former Kingdom of Hungary, including the Kingdom of Croatia-Slavonia and Vojvodina. Other ethnic German groups previously lived on the territory of both the former Hungarian kingdom as well as on the territory of present-day Hungary since the Middle Ages onwards, most notably in Budapest but not only.

Hungarian Germans refers to the descendants of Danube Swabians who immigrated to the Carpathian Basin and surrounding regions, and who are now minorities in those areas. Many Hungarian Germans were expelled from the region between 1946 and 1948, and many now live in Germany or Austria, but also in Australia, Brazil, the United States, and Canada. However, many are still dispersed within present-day Hungary across 9 counties and the capital, Budapest.

History 

The migration of German-speaking groups into present-day Hungary began  approximately 1000 ago, when knights in the company of Giselle of Bavaria, the German-born wife of King Stephen I, first King of Hungary, entered the country. Furthermore, three distinct waves of ethnic German migration can be identified in Hungary before the 20th century. The first two waves of settlers arrived in the Kingdom of Hungary during the Middle Ages (more specifically during the High Middle Ages between the 11th and 13th centuries) and formed the core of the citizenry of a few towns in Upper Hungary (i.e. Zipser Germans, "Zipser Sachsen") and southern Transylvania (i.e. Transylvanian Saxons, "Siebenbürger Sachsen").

The third, largest wave of German-speaking immigrants arrived in Hungary as the result of a deliberate settlement policy of the Habsburg government after the Ottoman Empire was driven from Hungarian territory. Between 1711 and 1780, German-speaking settlers from Southern Germany, Austria, and Saxony emigrated to southwestern Hungary, including, Buda, Banat, and Szatmár County. This influx of immigrants helped to bring economic recovery and cultural distinction to these regions. By the end of the 18th century, over one million German-speaking residents lived in the Kingdom of Hungary. At the time, a flourishing German-speaking culture existed in the kingdom, publishing German-language literary works, newspapers, and magazines. Moreover, a German-language theater operated in the kingdom's capital, Budapest.

Throughout the 19th century, a strong German industrial community developed, particularly in the glass-blowing, masonry, and foundry metalworking sectors. In response, a strong Hungarian nationalist political movement rose in the second half of the century to assimilate German-speaking citizens and their economic power into Hungarian culture. The movement's objectives were advanced by a number of policies, including the forced replacement of German in ethnic German schools with Hungarian.

By 1918, at the end of World War I, almost two million Danube Swabians and other German-speaking peoples lived in what is now Hungary, Romania, Croatia, Slovakia, and the former Yugoslav republics. Between 1918 and 1945, several factors greatly reduced the number of German-speaking residents in the former kingdom; consequently, only thirty percent of the original German-speaking population was left after World War II. The number of Germans in the Hungarian kingdom was more than halved by the Treaty of Trianon in 1920, as the kingdom was forced to make large cessions of its territory to neighbouring countries.

In 1940, it became the official representative body of Hungarian Germans and was directly controlled by Germany. The Volksbund had representatives in the Hungarian parliament until 1945. Through limited volunteer enlistment and widespread conscription, as well as the wholesale transfer of entities of the domestic armed services, many ethnic Germans ended up serving in military units raised or controlled by the Third Reich and fighting on behalf of the German war effort in World War II. This included several units of the Waffen SS and spanned combat operations in the proximity of Hungary, its possessions, and beyond.

Toward the end of the Second World War, the German-speaking community in Hungary was seen as a scapegoat by the communists, and a process of ethnic cleansing was undertaken. Citing "security reasons", the advancing Red Army deported about 600,000 civilians and prisoners of war from Hungary, of whom 40,000–65,000 were Germans. A significant number of Germans, mostly members of Nazi organisations, avoiding or fearing deportation to Siberia, fled Hungary as well. Many Germans were sent to Germany, first to the American occupation zone, and later to the Soviet occupation zone. Overall, approximately 220,000 Germans were expelled from Hungary.

Expulsion 

With World War II still raging in 1945, various factions competing for immediate and postwar Hungarian political power sought to decide how to treat ethnic Germans. Opinions were divided, with the Hungarian Communist Party and its ally, the National Peasant Party, calling for the expulsion of all Germans, whereas the major democratic party, the Smallholder Party, favored deporting only former Volksbund and Waffen SS members. In May 1945, the Hungarian government announced that the problem was not a larger Swabian one but one of German fascists: it resolved to deport only former Waffen SS soldiers and confiscate the lands of Volksbund members. Shortly thereafter, however, it asked for authorization from Moscow to deport 200,000 to 250,000 ethnic Germans to the Soviet occupation zone of Germany. This was far greater than the number of Volksbund members, reinforcing the theory that the goal was the elimination of an unwanted ethnic group rather than just that of German fascists. The German population in Hungary, however, was never subject to the same brutal persecution and excesses as in Poland, Czechoslovakia or Yugoslavia.

The initiative for including the expulsion of ethnic Germans from Hungary at the August 1945 Potsdam "Big Three" conference came from the Soviet Union. Together with the Hungarian Communist Party, the USSR used the argument of collective Swabian guilt to hide their true goal of radical land reform. In the Spring of 1945, Marshall Voroshilov demanded from the Hungarian government the complete expulsion of the Germans from Hungary. All those ethnic Germans who declared German as their native language were considered eligible for transfer. The government estimated the number of Germans to be removed from Hungary to be 200,000 to 250,000.

Certain categories of Hungarian Germans were exempted from deportation, mostly those who had been active members of democratic parties or labor unions or persecuted by the Nazis for claiming Hungarian nationality. Later, in 1947, industrial workers in critical industries, miners, indispensable craftsmen and agricultural workers were also exempted, unless they had been Volksbund or Waffen SS members. Exemption committees established by the government were in reality under the control of the Communist Party. Thus on occasion, wealthy Swabians who had not been Volksbund members were expelled whereas working-class ethnic Germans, now Hungarian Communist Party members, were exempted, even though they had been part of the Volksbund.

Voices were raised in Hungary against these arbitrary expulsions. The liberal parties, particularly the Smallholder Party, and the surviving democratic press, criticized the sweeping nature of classifying every ethnic German as a traitor. Cardinal József Mindszenty (of Swabian origin), head of the Roman Catholic Church in Hungary and fierce anti-communist, repeatedly protested the confiscation of property and expulsion of ethnic Germans. He appealed to world public opinion, strongly condemning government treatment of ethnic Germans in Hungary. These protests had no effect, and with increasing communist domination of the Hungarian Government, all opposition was gradually eliminated. (In 1949, Cardinal Mindszenty was tried for treason by the Communist government and given a life sentence. In the 1956 Hungarian revolution, he was given asylum in the U.S. Embassy in Budapest, from whence he was finally allowed to go into exile in 1971.)

The expulsion of ethnic Germans occurred in two phases: the first phase lasted from January to June 1946 and, after a short interruption in the summer of 1946, continued until December 1946. The refugees were first sent to the American zone of occupation in Germany. The second phase of expulsions began in August 1947. Because the U.S. Government refused to take any more refugees into its zone, the ethnic Germans were sent to the Soviet zone of occupation. About 50,000 Swabian Germans were transferred to camps in Saxony, from which they were later dispersed to other areas in the Soviet zone. But by this time, the majority of the ethnic Germans remaining in Hungary were anxious to leave, as their living conditions had become unbearable. Ironically, in this second wave of expulsions, the most skilled and industrious German workers were removed from Hungary. This had a long-term detrimental effect on the Hungarian economy. The expulsions were completely discontinued in the autumn of 1948.

In all, 239,000 Swabian Germans were forced to leave Hungary. About 170,000 went to the US zone in Germany, 54,000 to the Soviet zone, and 15,000 to Austria. It is estimated that 11,000 ethnic Germans civilians lost their lives during the expulsions.

Those ethnic Germans who had opted for Hungarian nationality in the 1941 census, who selected Hungarian as their native language, and who were completely integrated into Hungarian society, were generally able to avoid deportation. By 1948, with communists dominating the Hungarian Government, class warfare took precedence over nationalism. Communist Party leader Rákosi stated that the remaining Swabians, mostly skilled workers, should be reintegrated into the Hungarian State. In October 1949, a general amnesty of all ethnic Germans was decreed. Six months later, in May 1950, the expulsions were officially ended, and all remaining Germans given Hungarian citizenship. This created another crisis among Hungary's German community, whose members could no longer leave the country because they were Hungarian citizens.

Treatment in post-World War II Hungary 

Things began to improve for minority groups, including Hungarian Germans, under a program of economic liberalization called Goulash Communism. This movement, led by the then-General Secretary of the Hungarian Communist Party János Kádár, guaranteed certain economic and cultural rights to minority groups. In 1955, a new organization, the Association of Hungarian Germans, was founded. A major focus of the group was the teaching of the German language in Hungarian schools. Because of the government's previous position on German culture, very little German was taught in schools at the time, and the group's organizer feared "a mute generation" had been raised by the Hungarian school system. The group's organizers felt that the Hungarian German youth had a very poor command of the German language, including limited speech comprehension, which they found disturbing. The group met with success in the 1980s, when German gained status as a minority language, thus gaining legal standing in the Hungarian school system. The number of bilingual schools continued to rise. In 2001, 62,105 people declared themselves to be German, and 88,209 people declared an affinity with German cultural values and traditions.

In the 2018 Hungarian parliamentary election, a representative of Hungary's German minority – Imre Ritter of the National Self-Government of Germans in Hungary – was elected for the first time since 1933.

See also 

 Germany–Hungary relations
 Society of Germans from Hungary
 Neues Budapester Abendblatt

References

External links 
  Portal of Hungarian Germans
  Neue Zeitung, weekly magazine for Germans of Hungary
  Unsere Post, newspaper for Germans of Hungary
  Hungarian Germans' Self Government
  Ungarndeutsche Museum

 

 
Hungarian German communities
Demographics of Hungary

German minorities
Ethnic groups in Hungary
Hungary